Men's 5000m races for wheelchair athletes at the 2004 Summer Paralympics were held in the Athens Olympic Stadium. Events were held in two disability classes.

T52

The T52 event consisted of a single race. It was won by Toshihiro Takada, representing .

Final Round
19 Sept. 2004, 20:20

T54

The T54 event consisted of 2 heats and a final. It was won by Kurt Fearnley, representing .

1st Round

Heat 1
22 Sept. 2004, 09:35

Heat 2
22 Sept. 2004, 09:50

Final Round
24 Sept. 2004, 19:55

References

M